Paracoptops is a genus of longhorn beetles of the subfamily Lamiinae, containing the following species:

 Paracoptops basalis  (Pascoe, 1865)
 Paracoptops caledonica Breuning, 1942
 Paracoptops djampeanus Breuning, 1960
 Paracoptops isabellae Gilmour, 1947
 Paracoptops papuana Breuning, 1939
 Paracoptops toxopoei Aurivillius, 1926

References

Mesosini